Lieutenant Frederick Gotthold Enslin was a Continental Army officer who the focus of one of three possible cases of sodomy documented in the Continental Army under General George Washington.  The case began with a charge against an ensign for slander against another soldier.  At Valley Forge, Pennsylvania, in February 1778, Ensign Anthony Maxwell was brought before a court-martial charged with "propagating a scandalous report prejudicial to the character of Lieut. Enslin."  Maxwell was ultimately acquitted of the charge.

In March 1778, Enslin was brought to trial before a court-martial.  According to General Washington's report: "...Lieutt. Enslin of Colo. Malcolm's Regiment tried for attempting to commit sodomy ..."  Washington's secretary continues to describe the results of the trial:  "His Excellency the Commander in Chief approves the sentence and with Abhorrence & Detestation of such Infamous Crimes orders Lieut. Enslin to be drummed out of Camp tomorrow morning...."

The diary of Lieutenant James McMichael records the sentence being carried out on 15 March 1778:

He may be identical to "Gotthold Fried. Enslin" who arrived in Philadelphia on the ship Union from Rotterdam on 30 September 1774. "Gotthold Friderich Ensslin" was christened the day after his birth in the Lutheran Church in Ober Kochen, Wuerttemberg, Germany on 11 August 1755, son of Johann Friderich Ensslin and Magdalena Elisabetha Venningerin.

See also
Sexual orientation and gender identity in the United States military

References

Year of birth missing
Year of death missing
18th-century American people
Continental Army officers from Germany
Continental Army personnel who were court-martialed
American military personnel discharged for homosexuality
History of LGBT civil rights in the United States
18th-century LGBT people
American people convicted of sodomy